The Blueprint is the sixth studio album by American rapper Jay-Z, released on September 11, 2001, through Roc-A-Fella Records and Def Jam Recordings. Its release was set a week earlier than initially planned in order to combat bootlegging. Recording sessions for the album took place during 2001 at Manhattan Center Studios and Baseline Studios in New York City. Contrasting the radio-friendly sound of Jay-Z's previous work, The Blueprint features soul-based sampling and production handled primarily by Kanye West, Just Blaze, and Bink, as well as Timbaland, Trackmasters, and Eminem, who also contributes the album's sole guest feature.

At the time of the album's recording, Jay-Z was awaiting two criminal trials, one for gun possession and another for assault, and had become one of hip hop's most dissed artists, receiving insults from rappers such as Nas, Prodigy, and Jadakiss. The album is also famous for both its producers Kanye West and Just Blaze's breakouts as major producers. West produced four of the thirteen tracks on the album, including the songs "Izzo (H.O.V.A.)" and the controversial "Takeover", which included diss lyrics aimed at rappers Nas and Prodigy, while Just Blaze produced three tracks, "Girls, Girls, Girls", "Song Cry", and "U Don't Know", also including the hidden bonus track "Breathe Easy (Lyrical Exercise)".

The Blueprint received universal acclaim from music critics, with praise being directed at Jay-Z's lyricism and the production. It is considered one of his best albums and has also been labeled as one of the greatest hip-hop albums of all time. Despite its release coinciding with the September 11 attacks, it sold over 427,000 copies in its opening week and debuted at number one in the US, holding the spot for three weeks. It was later certified 2x Multi-Platinum by the RIAA. In 2019, the album was selected by the Library of Congress for preservation in the United States National Recording Registry for being "culturally, historically, or aesthetically significant," being the first entry created in the 21st century.

Background 
The Blueprint was reportedly cut in two weeks, with Jay-Z recording nine songs in two days. At the time, he was awaiting two criminal trials for gun possession and assault. He was also engaged in feuds with various rappers such as Jadakiss, Fat Joe and in particular Nas and Mobb Deep member Prodigy. In the song "Takeover", Jay-Z attacks the two Queensbridge rappers, using a sample of the song "Five to One" by The Doors and an interpolation of David Bowie's "Fame". On The Blueprint, Jay-Z and his producers used vintage soul as inspiration, including a vocal sample on almost every track from such artists as Al Green, Bobby "Blue" Bland, David Ruffin and The Jackson 5. Exceptions include "Jigga That Nigga", "Hola Hovito", and "Renegade", a track produced by and featuring the rapper Eminem, and the only track on the album featuring another rapper on verses.

Blueprint Lounge Tour 
In late August, Jay-Z announced a September–October tour in small venues. Because of the September 11 attacks occurring on the same day the album was released, the first two performances were rescheduled. Chicago, San Francisco, and Los Angeles were subsequently added, and Jay-Z donated to relief organizations one dollar of the cost of each ticket sold for the tour.

Cover 
The photograph on the album's cover, taken by Jonathan Mannion, was inspired by one from The Firm, a series by Jocelyn Bain Hogg depicting organized crime in Britain. Instead of the telephone and brass knuckles seen next to the ashtray in the original picture, a cigar, a pack of cigars and a microphone were placed.

Reception and impact 

The Blueprint received rave reviews from critics. At Metacritic, which assigns a normalized rating out of 100 to reviews from mainstream critics, the album received an average score of 88, which indicates "universal acclaim", based on 12 reviews. Upon its release, The Blueprint was hailed by Vibes dream hampton as Jay-Z's best album, as well as the best album of the year, while The Source awarded The Blueprint a perfect "five-mic" rating, a distinction reserved for hip hop classics. Nathan Rabin called it Jay-Z's "strongest, tightest, most consistent album since his legendary debut, 1996's Reasonable Doubt."

The popularity and commercial success of The Blueprint established Kanye West and Just Blaze as two of hip hop's most celebrated producers. West in particular would later be signed by Roc-A-Fella Records in 2002. Both West and Just Blaze would go on to have successful music careers. Furthermore, The Blueprint signaled a major stylistic shift in hip hop production towards a more Soulcentric and sample-reliant sound, creating a number of imitators who attempted to emulate the album's atmospheric style. Prior to The Blueprint, mainstream hip-hop producers had largely eschewed music sampling in favor of the keyboard-driven Timbaland sound (characterized by a shifting, syncopated rhythm, similar to samba or jungle music), due to the financial and legal issues associated with copyright laws.

The Blueprint, however, revived musical sampling as a common practice in hip hop music and dislodged the digital keyboard-driven production style as the dominant sound in hip-hop music. West would later incorporate some of the production and sampling techniques he used on this album into his own solo albums. Entertainment Weekly put it on its end-of-the-decade, "best-of" list, saying, "One of the greatest poets ever to pick up a mic released his magnum opus in 2001. One retirement and one un-retirement later, it's still his finest hour."

In 2003, The Blueprint was ranked number 464 on Rolling Stone magazine's list of the 500 greatest albums of all time; in a revised list in 2012, it was ranked number 252; in the 2020 revised list, the album was ranked number 50. Pitchfork named The Blueprint the second best album of 2000–2004, and in 2010, it ranked fifth on their Top 200 Albums of the 2000s list. It is ranked at number 4 on Rolling Stone magazine's list of the "100 Best Albums of the 2000s". The album received a perfect "XXL" rating from XXL magazine in a 2007 retrospective article. The Blueprint was also included in the book 1001 Albums You Must Hear Before You Die.

Accolades 
Album of the Year
 Ranked #4 in NMEs 50 "Albums of the Year 2001".
 Ranked #5 in Rolling Stones "Top 10 of 2001".
 Ranked #7 in Spin magazines "Albums of the Year 2001".
 Ranked #12 in Wire magazine's "50 Records of the Year 2001".

Best Album of the 2000s
 Ranked #1 in Complex Magazines "The 100 Best Albums of the 2000s".
 Ranked #7 in The Stylus Decade's "Top 100 Albums of the 2000s".
 Ranked #4 in Rolling Stone magazine's list of "100 Best Albums of the 2000s"
 Ranked #5 in Pitchfork's "The Top 200 Albums of the 2000s".

Top Album
 Ranked #6 in Billboards Critics Pick of the decade 1999-2009
 Ranked #2 in Pitchforks "The Top 100 Albums of 2000-04".
 Ranked #5 in Stylus Magazines "Top 50 Albums of 2000-2005".

Best Album of the Decade
 Ranked #2 in Entertainment Weeklys Best Albums of the Decade.
 Ranked #42 in Pastes 50 Best Albums of the Decade.
 Ranked #4 in Rolling Stone magazine's list of the 100 Best Albums of the Decade in 2009.
 Ranked #20 in Rhapsody's "100 Best Albums of the Decade" in 2009.
 Ranked #8 in Vibe's "The Greatest 50 Albums Since '93" in 2013.

Greatest Album of All Time
 Ranked #456 in Rolling Stone magazine's list of the 500 greatest albums of all time in 2003.
 Ranked #252 in Rolling Stone magazine's revised list of the 500 greatest albums of all time in 2012.
 Ranked #50 in Rolling Stone magazine's revised list of the 500 greatest albums of all time in 2020.
 Unranked in 1001 Albums You Must Hear Before You Die

Commercial performance
In spite of its release coinciding with the 9/11 attacks, The Blueprint sold over 427,000 copies in its opening week, becoming Jay-Z's fourth consecutive album to reach number one on the Billboard 200 chart. It was certified double platinum as sales stand at over two million units in the U.S. 
Sales stand at 2.7 million as of February 2012.

Track listing

Notes
 signifies an additional producer
 "Takeover" features additional vocals by Josey Scott.
 "Izzo (H.O.V.A.)" features uncredited vocals by Demme Uloa.
 "Girls, Girls, Girls" features additional vocals by Q-Tip, Slick Rick and Biz Markie.
 "Jigga That Nigga" features additional vocals by Stephanie Miller and Michelle Mills.
 "Heart Of The City (Ain't No Love)" features uncredited vocals by Keon Bryce.
 "Never Change" features uncredited vocals by Kanye West.
 "Blueprint (Momma Loves Me)" features background vocals by Schevise Harrell and Luren Leek.
 "Girls, Girls, Girls (Part 2)" features uncredited vocals by Michael Jackson.

Samples
 "The Ruler's Back" contains a sample of "If" performed by Jackie Moore, and an interpolation of "The Ruler's Back" performed by Slick Rick.
 "Takeover" contains samples of "Five to One" performed by The Doors, "Sound of da Police" performed by KRS-One, and an interpolation of "Fame" performed by David Bowie.
 "Izzo (H.O.V.A.)" contains a sample of "I Want You Back" performed by Jackson 5.
 "Girls, Girls, Girls" contains a sample of "There's Nothing in This World That Can Stop Me from Loving You" performed by Tom Brock, and "High Power Rap" performed by Crash Crew.
 "U Don't Know" contains a sample of "I'm Not to Blame" performed by Bobby Byrd.
 "Heart of the City (Ain't No Love)" contains a sample of "Ain't No Love in the Heart of the City" performed by Bobby Blue Bland.
 "Never Change" contains a sample of "Common Man" performed by David Ruffin.
 "Song Cry" contains a sample of "Sounds Like a Love Song" performed by Bobby Glenn.
 "All I Need" contains a sample of "I Can't Break Away" performed by Natalie Cole.
 "Blueprint (Momma Loves Me)" contains a sample of "Free at Last" performed by Al Green.
 "Breathe Easy (Lyrical Exercise)" contains a sample of "Got to Find My Own Place" performed by Stanley Clarke.
 "Girls, Girls, Girls (Part 2)" contains a sample of "Trying Girls Out" performed by The Persuaders.

Bonus tracks 
As with Vol. 3... Life and Times of S. Carter, Jay-Z put two hidden bonus tracks at the end of the final track. "Blueprint (Momma Loves Me)" is 3:41 by itself. Twenty-five seconds of silence follows after and the bonus track "Breathe Easy (Lyrical Exercise)" begins. That song fades and is immediately followed by "Girls, Girls, Girls (Part 2)". It is reported that the latter song features uncredited vocals by Michael Jackson. The final track as a whole is 12:07. On the iTunes Store, however, these bonus tracks are released as separate tracks, thus making the album 15 tracks long. On the vinyl edition, there are no long gaps between the songs, but they are not printed on the back of the album jacket or record label.

Personnel 

 Shawn "Jay-Z" Carter – performer, executive producer
 Eminem – performer, producer, mixing
 Slick Rick – vocals
 Q-Tip – vocals
 Biz Markie – vocals
 Demme Ulloa – vocals
 Schevise Harrell – vocals
 Lauren Leek – vocals
 Keon Bryce – vocals
 Stephanie Miller – vocals
 Michele Mills – vocals
 Josey Scott – vocals
 Victor Flowers – organ
 Kanye West – producer, vocals
 Just Blaze – producer
 Bink – producer
 Timbaland – producer
 Poke & Tone – producer
 DJ Head – drum programming

 Damon Dash – executive producer
 Kareem "Biggs" Burke – executive producer
 Gimel "Young Guru" Keaton – engineer, mixing
 Jimmy Douglas – engineer, mixing
 Rajon Wright – assistant engineer
 Shane Woodley	– assistant engineer
 Jason Goldstein – mixing
 Richard Huredia – mixing
 Supa Engineer "Duro" – mixing
 Doug Wilson – mixing
 Tony Vanias – recording director
 Tony Dawsey – mastering
 Jason Noto – art direction
 Jonathan Mannion – photography
 Della Valle – images
 Dana "Sonni Black" Anderson – composer
 Sonet Lumiere Philadelphia – music publisher

Charts

Weekly charts

Year-end charts

Certifications

See also 
List of number-one albums of 2001 (U.S.)
List of number-one R&B albums of 2001 (U.S.)

References

External links 
 The Blueprint at Discogs
 The Blueprint at Metacritic
 Album Review at Blender
 Album review at Stylus Magazine
 Album accolades at acclaimedmusic.net

2001 albums
Jay-Z albums
Albums produced by Bink (record producer)
Albums produced by Eminem
Albums produced by Just Blaze
Albums produced by Kanye West
Albums produced by Timbaland
Albums produced by Trackmasters
Roc-A-Fella Records albums
United States National Recording Registry recordings
United States National Recording Registry albums
Def Jam Recordings albums